The Speaker of the Parliament of Ghana is the presiding officer of the Parliament of Ghana. The current speaker is Alban Kingsford Sumana Bagbin. He was elected on 7 January 2021.

History

The first speaker of the Parliament of Ghana was Sir Emmanuel Charles Quist who was Speaker of the National Assembly from independence on 6 March 1957 until December 1957. Prior to Ghana's independence, the Governor of Ghana presided over the legislative council. This changed in 1949 when Emmanuel Quist became its first African president. The Legislative Council elected Quist as its first speaker in 1951. The longest serving speaker was Daniel Francis Annan who served from 7 January 1993 to 6 January 2001. In January 2009, Joyce Adeline Bamford-Addo became the first lady to be speaker of the Ghanaian parliament.

Appointment and office tenure
Article 95 of the 1992 Ghana constitution provides for the election of a speaker from among the members of parliament or from persons who are qualified to be members of parliament. Where the speaker is elected from among the members of parliament, Article 97 of the constitution specifies that the Speaker vacates his or her seat in Parliament, triggering a by-election. The only person to have been in this position so far is Edward Adjaho who was the elected member for the then Akatsi South constituency.

Deputy Speaker
There are two Deputy Speakers who are elected from among the members of parliament by the members. Both deputy speakers cannot be from the same political party. The current Deputy Speakers are the MP for Bekwai, Joseph Osei-Owusu, of the New Patriotic Party and MP for Fomena, Andrew Asiamah Amoako, an Independent MP.

Role
Article 101 of the Ghana Constitution stipulates that the Speaker presides at all sittings of parliament. Where the speaker is not able to do so, one of the two deputies presides. No parliamentary business can take place without the speaker in the chair.
The speaker also takes precedence over all people in Ghana except the President of Ghana and the Vice President. In view of this, the speaker may act on behalf of the president if neither the president nor the vice president is able to do so. The constitution stipulates that there should be an election within three months of the speaker assuming the presidency due to the death or removal of the president and vice president. The Speaker does not have a vote in parliament. This means that when the votes are tied, the motion is lost. The Speaker is also the chairman of the parliamentary Service Board. The Speaker also appoints four additional members to this board. The sixth member of the board is the Clerk of Parliament.

List of speakers

Demographics

See also
Parliament of Ghana

References

External links 
Parliament of Ghana official website

Legislative speakers
Parliament of Ghana
Speakers of the Parliament of Ghana